PEC Zwolle Vrouwen is a Dutch women's football team from Zwolle. The team was founded in 2010, starting in the Eredivisie season 2010–11. The club was the first two seasons working together with Be Quick '28. Currently they are working together with SV Zwolle who is playing in the Hoofdklasse.

PEC Zwolle was formerly known as FC Zwolle until 1 July 2012 when the KNVB approved the new name. 

PEC Zwolle played also in the BeNe League during all three years the league was played.

Results Eredivisie / BeNe League

Players

Current squad

Former players

Former internationals

 Sylvia Smit
 Lianne de Vries
 Maria-Laura Aga
 Jassina Blom
 Doreen Nabwire
 Marlo Sweatman

Head coaches
  Bert Zuurman (2010–2013)
  Sebastiaan Borgardijn (2013–2016)
  Carin Meesters-Bakhuis (2016–2017)
  Wim van der Wal (2017-2019
  Joran Pot (2019-2022)
  Roeland ten Berge (2022)
  Olivier Amelink (2022-)

References

Women's football clubs in the Netherlands
BeNe League teams
Eredivisie (women) teams
2010 establishments in the Netherlands
Association football clubs established in 2010
Football clubs in Zwolle